Makogai (pronounced ) is an island belonging to Fiji's Lomaiviti Archipelago. Makogai is visible from Ovalau.

The beach forest, cycad dominated, and coastal/marine ecosystem of the island and its surrounding reef contribute to its national significance as outlined in Fiji's Biodiversity Strategy and Action Plan.

The island used to house a leper colony owned by the colonial government of Fiji with the help of the Missionary Sisters of the Society of Mary. The number of patients grew from 40 when the leprosarium opened in 1911 to 700 in 1950. They were nursed by Catholic sisters. Mother Mary Agnes was the superior of the lepers colony from 1916 until 1950. Patients were coming from all the British colonies of the Pacific as well as from the various territories of the Dominion of New Zealand after 1922.

Patients who were not residing at the hospital were living in villages organized by ethnicity, each community being allowed to keep their traditions and religious practices. As part of occupational therapy, patients were expected to grow food, fish, do craft work or graze cattle. The leprosarium was renowned internationally as a model of discipline and social peace even though the Fijian government imposed a racial hierarchy on the island resulting in white people receiving more rations than non-white. The Fijian government was charging accommodation fees to the various governments sending lepers depending on the race of the patient. Fees were higher for whites, lower for Chinese, Indians and Maori and a lot lower for Pacific islanders. The leper colony operated until the 1960s.

See also

 List of islands

References

Islands of Fiji
Lomaiviti Province
Leper colonies
Preliminary Register of Sites of National Significance in Fiji